Richard Ernst may refer to:

Richard R. Ernst (1933–2021), Swiss physical chemist and Nobel Laureate
Richard P. Ernst (1858–1934), U.S. Senator from Kentucky

See also 
Richard Ernst Meyer, mathematician and engineer